Isla Lang Fisher (born 3 February 1976) is an  Australian actress and author. Born to Scottish parents in Oman, she moved to Australia at age six where she began appearing in television commercials. Fisher came to prominence for her portrayal of Shannon Reed on the Australian soap opera Home and Away from 1994–97, for which she received two Logie Award nominations.

After various appearances on television and stage, Fisher made a successful transition to Hollywood with her portrayal of Mary Jane in the 2002 live-action adaptation of Scooby-Doo, and has since played prominent roles in films such as Wedding Crashers (2005), Confessions of a Shopaholic (2009), Bachelorette (2012), The Great Gatsby, Now You See Me (both 2013), and Nocturnal Animals (2016). Her other notable credits include Swimming Pool (2001), I Heart Huckabees (2004), London (2005), Wedding Daze (2006), The Lookout, Hot Rod (both 2007), Definitely, Maybe (2008), Burke & Hare (2010), Visions (2015), Grimsby, Keeping Up with the Joneses (both 2016), Tag (2018), The Beach Bum, Greed (both 2019), and Blithe Spirit (2020). She has also voiced characters in animated films such as Horton Hears a Who! (2008), Rango (2011), and
Rise of the Guardians (2012). 

Outside film, Fisher played a recurring role on the fourth and fifth seasons of Arrested Development (2013, 2018–19), and currently stars as Mary on Wolf Like Me (2022–present). Fisher has authored two young adult novels and the Marge in Charge book series. She is married to Sacha Baron Cohen, with whom she has three children.

Early life
Fisher was born in Muscat, Oman, on 3 February 1976, she is the daughter of Elspeth Reid and Brian Fisher from Scotland. Her father was working as a banker in Oman for the United Nations. Fisher and her family returned to their hometown of Bathgate, Scotland, then moved to Perth, Western Australia, when she was six. She has four brothers, and said that she had a "great" upbringing in Perth with a "very outdoorsy life". She has stated that her "sensibility is Australian", she has a "laid-back attitude to life", and that she feels "very Australian". She considers herself a feminist. Her mother and siblings live in Athens, Greece, while her father lives in Frankfurt, Germany. Fisher attended Swanbourne Primary School and Methodist Ladies' College, Perth. She appeared in lead roles in school productions such as Little Shop of Horrors. At 21, she attended L'École Internationale de Théâtre Jacques Lecoq in Paris, where she studied clown, mime, musical theatre and commedia dell'arte.

Career

1985–2001: Early acting credits
Fisher made her first on-screen appearances in commercials on Australian television at the age of 9, and made her professional acting debut in 1993 with two guest-starring roles in the children's television shows Bay City and Paradise Beach. At 18, with her mother's help, she published two teen novels, Bewitched and Seduced by Fame. In a 2005 interview with Sunday Mirror, she said that had she not been successful as an actress, she would probably have been a full-time writer.

Between 1994 and 1997, Fisher played Shannon Reed, a young, unconfident bisexual woman who develops anorexia, on the Australian soap opera Home and Away. In a 1996 interview with The Sun-Herald, she spoke of her success and experiences on the show: "I would be stupid to let it go to my head because it could all end tomorrow and I would just fade back into obscurity [...] I like working on Home and Away but it's a heavy workload so I get stressed out a lot. We work about 15 hours a day, including the time it takes to learn lines. I know a lot of people work those sort of hours but I think we really feel it because most of us are young and fairly inexperienced [...] But I am very grateful because it is good experience. It's like an apprenticeship, but we do it in front of 20 million people so all our mistakes are up for the world to see." For her performance in the series, Fisher received nominations for Most Popular New Talent at the 1995 Logie Awards, and for Most Popular Actress at the 1997 ceremony.

After leaving the soap, Fisher enrolled at L'École Internationale de Théâtre Jacques Lecoq, a theatre and arts training school in Paris, and went on to appear in pantomime in the United Kingdom. She also toured with Darren Day in the musical Summer Holiday; appeared in the London theatre production of Così, and played an ill-fated member of an elite group of international students in the German slasher film Swimming Pool (2001).

2002–2004: Move to Hollywood
Fisher transitioned to Hollywood in 2002, with the part of the love interest of a cowardly slacker Shaggy Rogers in the live-action film Scooby-Doo. Although Scooby-Doo received negative reviews, the film was a commercial success, grossing US$275.7 million worldwide. On that early stage in her career, Fisher remarked: "I only came out on the back of [the movie] — for the premiere of Scooby Doo. And then, I ended up getting representation and ended up getting a job, almost straight away. So, I was fortunate, in that I didn't have to come out to L.A. and join a queue of however many people, and try to get work. I came in on the back of what was deemed as a big studio movie that had had extraordinary success". She subsequently played supporting roles in the independent film Dallas 362 (2003) and the Australian comedy The Wannabes (also 2003). In his review for the latter, David Rooney of Variety felt that Fisher "adds easy charm and a thinly developed hint of romantic interest", in what he summed as an "uneven but endearing farce about breaking into showbiz". In the comedy I Heart Huckabees (2004), directed by David O. Russell, she played what was described as a "punchy little part", by newspaper The Age.

2005–2009: Breakthrough

Fisher's breakthrough came with the comedy Wedding Crashers (2005), opposite Vince Vaughn and Owen Wilson, taking on the role of the seemingly sexually aggressive and precocious younger daughter of a politician falling in love with an irresponsible wedding crasher. On her part in the film, she remarked: "It was an interesting character to play, because she was so crazy and lacking in any kind of social etiquette. She doesn't care what anyone thinks." For one particular scene, involving sexual content, she used a body double. "I negotiated that from the beginning, trying to analyse why. I find pornographic violence, just gratuitous and unnecessary than nudity, because there's nothing more peaceful and beautiful". The film was favourably received by critics and made US$285.1 million worldwide. Empire magazine found Fisher to be an "unexpected, scene-stealing joy", and her performance earned her the Breakthrough Performance Award at the MTV Movie Awards and two Teen Choice Awards nominations.

Fisher appeared as a Manhattan party host in the independent drama London (2005), opposite Jessica Biel, Chris Evans and Jason Statham. She next starred in the romantic comedy Wedding Daze (2006), with Jason Biggs, playing a dissatisfied waitress who spontaneously gets engaged to a grieving young man. While Wedding Daze opened in second place on its UK opening weekend, the film received mediocre reviews from critics. Nevertheless, Reel Film Reviews found the film to be an "irreverent, sporadically hilarious romantic comedy that boasts fantastic performances from stars Jason Biggs and Isla Fisher". In the thriller The Lookout (2007), opposite Joseph Gordon-Levitt and Matthew Goode, Fisher played a woman used by a gang leader to seduce a man with lasting mental impairments. Describing on how she took her character, she said: "[I]t was one of those situations where I read the script and thought, 'This is the take. I don't want to play the cliché femme fatale. I don't want to come in and be the woman with the sexual appetite, who wants to take down this man. I want to come in and make her this big beating heart, and innocent —a woman who has no identity, who knows the man she's with, who doesn't have an agenda'. Because every character in the script has an agenda. I thought how interesting if [my character] doesn't have one if she's a victim of her own kindness. So, that was my starting point". While The Lookout received a limited release, the film was favourably received. The comedy Hot Rod (also 2007), with Andy Samberg, saw Fisher star as the college-graduate neighbour on whom an amateur stuntman has a crush.

Fisher played a copy girl who becomes romantically involved with an ambitious political consultant in the romantic comedy Definitely, Maybe (2008), with Ryan Reynolds, Elizabeth Banks, Rachel Weisz and Abigail Breslin. Reviewers felt the film was a "refreshing entry into the romantic comedy genre", and The New Yorker wrote that the "interest lies" in the female characters, concluding: "Isla Fisher, short, with thick auburn hair, is a changeable free spirit who keeps [the male lead]—and maybe herself—off balance". Budgeted at US$7 million, Definitely, Maybe was a commercial success, grossing US$55.4 million worldwide. Fisher also voiced a professor in a city of microscopic creatures in the computer-animated comedy hit Horton Hears a Who! (2008), featuring Jim Carrey, Steve Carell, Will Arnett, among others.

Fisher obtained her first leading film role in the comedy Confessions of a Shopaholic (2009), where she played a college graduate who works as a financial journalist in New York City to support her shopping addiction. She felt "apprehensive" as she took on her first star vehicle, stating: "I was gobsmacked that anyone would give me my own movie. I am eternally bewildered. Every time I see [producer] Jerry Bruckheimer, I want to shake him and say: 'Are you mad? Why would you put me on a poster?'". Upon its release, the film received lukewarm reviews from critics; while Time Out described her as "silly and adorable", The Christian Science Monitor remarked: "Isla Fisher is such a bundle of comic energy that watching her spin her wheels in the aggressively unfunny Confessions of a Shopaholic counts as cruel and unusual punishment —for her as well as for us". Despite the critical response, the film was a commercial success; it opened with US$15 million on its North America opening weekend and went on to gross US$108.3 million worldwide. Fisher received her third Teen Choice Award nomination.

2010–2013: Mainstream recognition
In the British black comedy Burke and Hare (2010), loosely based on the Burke and Hare murders, Fisher starred opposite Simon Pegg and Andy Serkis as a young former prostitute and the love interest of one of the titular characters. The film found a limited audience in theatres, and Variety wrote that "Pegg and Fisher, just about holding up their end of the bargain by delivering the film's portion of sweet romance, are hardly given anything funny to say", as part of an overall mixed reception. Fisher voiced a hot-tempered but good-hearted desert iguana befriending an eccentric chameleon in the 3D animated Western action comedy Rango (2011), featuring Johnny Depp, Abigail Breslin and Bill Nighy. The film received positive reviews and made US$245.7 million worldwide. For her role, Fisher won the Alliance of Women Film Journalists Award for Best Animated Female.

Fisher starred in the comedy Bachelorette (2012), opposite Kirsten Dunst, Lizzy Caplan and Rebel Wilson, portraying a ditzy party girl and one-third of a trio of troubled women who reunite for the wedding of a friend who was ridiculed in high school. In its review for the film, Daily Telegraph found Fisher to be "brilliantly slow as a hot mess whose main ambition is to get coked out of her skull". Budgeted at US$3 million, Bachelorette was a commercial success; it grossed US$11.9 million in theaters worldwide and more than US$8 million on VOD. In another voice-over role, Fisher voiced the Tooth Fairy in what she summed up as an "animated Avengers", the film Rise of the Guardians (also 2012), which earned her an Alliance of Women Film Journalists Award nomination for Best Animated Female.

Fisher found mainstream recognition in 2013, with roles in two highly successful films —The Great Gatsby and Now You See Me. The Great Gatsby, an adaptation of F. Scott Fitzgerald's 1925 novel, directed by Baz Luhrmann and opposite Leonardo DiCaprio, Carey Mulligan and Tobey Maguire, saw her portray an ambitious social climber and the mistress of an upper-class socialite. Fisher described as "surreal" the experience to work for Luhrmann. "He's my dream director. I've only ever had a short list of people I've wanted to work with, and he was at the top of it. I honestly couldn't stop smiling the whole time". While reviewers described her role as brief, the film made US$353.6 million worldwide. Fisher garnered nominations for the Best Supporting Actress award from the AACTA Awards, the Australian Film Critics Association and the Film Critics Circle of Australia Awards. Fisher took on a larger role as an escapist and stage magician in the heist thriller Now You See Me, with Jesse Eisenberg, Mark Ruffalo, Woody Harrelson, Mélanie Laurent and Morgan Freeman. The Hollywood Reporter felt that Fisher's portrayal was "loaded with chutzpah", and IndieWire remarked in its review for the film: "[W]hile Fisher and Laurent bring their charm, they still don't quite flesh out underwritten parts". Like The Great Gatsby, Now You See Me grossed more than US$350 million globally.

Also in 2013, Fisher obtained the nine-episode role of an actress in the fourth season of Arrested Development, which was released on Netflix, and appeared opposite Jennifer Aniston, Tim Robbins, and Will Forte in Life of Crime, a film adaptation of Elmore Leonard's 1978 novel The Switch, as the mistress of a wealthy man who refuses to pay the ransom for his kidnapped wife. The film received a limited theatrical release and favorable reviews from critics. Fisher, along with the cast of Arrested Development, received a Screen Actors Guild Award nomination for Outstanding Performance by an Ensemble in a Comedy Series, and describing her work on the series as a career highlight, she said: "I've been really fortunate in my career to work with a lot of great people and get a lot of great gigs, but my favourite phone call ever was the Arrested Development one from my agent [...] It was very exciting".

2014–present: Films and writing
In Visions (2015), an independent horror film, Fisher starred as a pregnant woman who begins to experience supernatural manifestations after moving to a vineyard with her husband. Distributed for a limited release in most international markets, Visions was released for VOD in North America, and in its review for the film, Spanish newspaper Reforma wrote: "Predictable and boring, even Isla Fisher, who is usually pretty good, delivers a very boring performance". 2016 saw Fisher star in two action comedy films —Grimsby and Keeping Up with the Joneses. She collaborated for the first time with husband Sacha Baron Cohen in the British film Grimsby, playing the handler of the best MI6 agent, and in Keeping Up with the Joneses, she starred as one half of a suburban couple who begin to suspect their new neighbors are secret agents. Both films were budgeted at over US$35 million, but only made less than US$30 million at the box office.

Based on Austin Wright's novel Tony and Susan, Tom Ford's neo-noir thriller Nocturnal Animals (2016) featured Fisher as the blighted wife of a motorist inside a violent novel written by a recently divorced man. The film was the winner of the Grand Jury Prize at the 73rd Venice International Film Festival and was an arthouse success. Her third book and first children's novel, Marge in Charge, revolving around a mischievous babysitter with rainbow hair who tends to bend the rules, was published in 2016. The book was met with a positive reception; Publishers Weekly noted that "spontaneity and mayhem" reign in the work, while The Daily Express found "the comic tale of [the] anarchic babysitter" to be "perfect for reading aloud". Fisher subsequently authored three follow-ups: Marge and the Pirate Baby, in 2017, Marge and the Great Train Rescue, also in 2017, and Marge in Charge and the Stolen Treasure, in 2018. In 2019, she guest starred in an episode of the tenth season of HBO's Curb Your Enthusiasm. In 2020, Fisher starred in the Walt Disney Pictures film Godmothered, which was released on Disney+ on 4 December of that year.

Personal life

Family
Fisher first met English comedian and actor Sacha Baron Cohen in 2001 at a party in Sydney. They became engaged in 2004 and were married on 15 March 2010 in a Jewish ceremony in Paris, France. The couple have three children, born in 2007, 2010, and 2015. The family once resided in the United States, and London.

Religion
Before marrying Baron Cohen, Fisher converted to Judaism (her husband's faith), saying, "I will definitely have a Jewish wedding just to be with Sacha. I would do anything—move into any religion—to be united in marriage with him. We have a future together and religion comes second to love as far as we are concerned." She completed her conversion in early 2007, after three years of study. She took the Hebrew name Ayala, the Hebrew word for a female deer, and has described herself as keeping the Jewish Sabbath.

Philanthropy
In 2014 and 2015, Fisher donated her signed shoes for Small Steps Project Celebrity Shoe Auction. In December 2015, Fisher and her husband Baron Cohen donated £335,000 (US$500,000) to Save the Children as part of a programme to vaccinate children in Northern Syria against measles, and the same amount to the International Rescue Committee also aimed at helping Syrian refugees.

Filmography

Film

Television

Awards and nominations

Works and publications

References

External links

 

1976 births
Living people
People from Muscat, Oman
People from Bathgate
Actresses from Perth, Western Australia
Australian film actresses
Australian television actresses
Australian voice actresses
20th-century Australian actresses
21st-century Australian actresses
Australian people of Scottish descent
Scottish emigrants to Australia
Baron Cohen family
Sacha Baron Cohen
Converts to Judaism
Jewish Australian actresses
L'École Internationale de Théâtre Jacques Lecoq alumni
People educated at Methodist Ladies' College, Perth
Australian expatriate actresses in the United States